Porbandar is one of the 182 Legislative Assembly constituencies of Gujarat state in India. It is part of Porbandar district. Since 2012 MLA from Porbandar is Babubhai Bokhiria of Bharatiya Janata Party.

Since 2006, this assembly seat represents Porbandar Taluka (Part) Villages – Bhetkadi, Advana, Simar, Rojhivada, Ishvariya, Bhomiyavadar, Sodhana, Shingda, Sisli, Miyani – Bhavpara, Vadala, Ambarama, Fatana, Majivana, Kunvadar, Morana, Paravada, Nagka, Bavalvav, Natvarnagar, Khambhodar, Kindar Kheda, Modhvada, Sakhpur, Tukda Miyani, Visavada, Palkhada, Keshav, Bagvadar, Vachhoda, Khistri, Vinjhrana, Godhana, Sinhjhar Nes, Katvana, Beran, Bharvada, Baradiya, Ratdi, Kantela, Shrinagar, Rinavada, Simani, Bakharla, Boricha, Pandavadar, Degam, Kuchhdi, Zaver, Kolikhada, Bokhira, Porbandar (M), Khapat, Chhaya (M).

Members of Legislative Assembly

Election results

2022

2017

2012

See also
List of constituencies of Gujarat Legislative Assembly
Gujarat Legislative Assembly

References

External links
 

Assembly constituencies of Gujarat
Porbandar